Ben Oakley (born 5 July 1988) is a British male canoeist who won a bronze medal at senior level at the Wildwater Canoeing World Championships.

References

External links
 

1988 births
Living people
British male canoeists
Place of birth missing (living people)